Maxey may refer to:

Places 
Maxey, Cambridgeshire, village in the City of Peterborough in England
Maxey Castle, a medieval fortified manor house castle
Maxey-sur-Meuse, commune in the Vosges department in Lorraine in France
Maxey-sur-Vaise, commune in the Meuse department in Lorraine in France

People 
Glen Maxey (born 1952), American politician from Texas; state legislator
Johnny Maxey (born 1993), American football player
Lawrence Maxey (contemporary), American musician and professor of music
Linda Maxey (contemporary), American concert marimbist
Marcus Maxey (born 1983), American professional football player
Marlon Maxey (born 1969), American professional basketball player
Maxey Dell Moody (1883-1949), American businessman
Morris Maxey Titterington (1891–1928), American engineer and aviator
Samuel B. Maxey (1825–1895), American soldier, lawyer, and politician from Texas; major general for the Confederacy during the American Civil War
Thomas Sheldon Maxey (1846–1921), United States federal judge
Tyrese Maxey (born 2000), American basketball player

Other 
Camp Maxey, U.S. Army National Guard training base near Paris, Texas, USA; infantry training camp during World War II
Maxey Flat, low-level radioactive waste facility Superfund site in Kentucky, U.S.
Sam Bell Maxey House, Texas state historic site in Paris, Texas, U.S.
W.J. Maxey Boys Training School, a former juvenile detention center in Whitmore Lake, Michigan, U.S.

See also
Maxie (disambiguation)